The Baatara gorge sinkhole (Baatara gorge waterfall) is a waterfall in the Chatine, Lebanon near Balaa.

The waterfall drops  into the Balaa Pothole, a cave of Jurassic limestone located on the Lebanon Mountain Trail. The cave is also known as the Cave of the Three Bridges. Traveling from Laklouk to Tannourine one passes the village of Balaa, and the Three Bridges Chasm (in French Gouffre des Trois Ponts) is a five-minute journey into the valley below where one sees three natural bridges, rising one above the other and overhanging a chasm descending into Mount Lebanon. During the spring melt, a  cascade falls behind the three bridges and then down into the  chasm. 

Discovered to the western world in 1952 by French bio-speleologist Henri Coiffait, the waterfall and accompanying sinkhole were fully mapped in the 1980s by the Spéléo club du Liban. A 1988 fluorescent dye test demonstrated that the water emerged at the spring of Dalleh in Mgharet al-Ghaouaghir (located near Balaa).

References

External links
Balaa the 3 leveled waterfall - Photograph
Gouffre de Balaa - Photograph

Waterfalls of Lebanon
Tourism in Lebanon
Tourist attractions in Lebanon